The 2006 Armenian Premier League season was the fifteenth since its establishment, and started on 14 April 2006. The last matches were played on 9 November 2006. FC Pyunik were the defending champions.

Participating teams

Ararat Yerevan and Gandzasar are promoted.
FC Lernagorts Kapan withdrew from the competition.
Esteghlal-Kotayk are renamed back to FC Kotayk.
Dinamo-Zenit are renamed Ulisses FC.

League table

Results

First half of season

Second half of season

Relegation/Promotion play-off

See also
 2006 Armenian First League
 2006 Armenian Cup

External links
 RSSSF: Armenia 2006 - Premier League

 

Armenian Premier League seasons
1
Armenia
Armenia